Wanless is an unincorporated hamlet in the province of Manitoba, Canada. Wanless had an estimated population of 183 in the mid-2010s. The place was named after homesteader Jack Wanless. Wanless is the only community in the Rural Municipality of Kelsey to be an enclave surrounded by land ungoverned by a municipality, besides Cranberry Portage. Wanless is served by the Manitoba Highway 10.

The town has a community centre, playground, church, and a fire station, provided by the Wanless Community Club, which also hosts some events within the community. Duck hunting is an important part of the tourism of Wanless, and also has a few hunting and fishing lodges. The Jimmy Jackfish Ice Fishing Derby happens in March in the Wanless area.

References  

Hamlets in Manitoba